Balić is a Croatian surname. It may refer to:

Andrija Balić (born 1997), Croatian footballer
Charles Balic (1899-1977), Croatian Franciscan Mariologist
Davorka Balić (born 1988), Croatian basketball player
Dominik Balić (born 1996), Croatian footballer
Ermin Balić, Montenegrin futsal player
Husein Balić (born 1996), Austrian footballer of Bosnian descent
Ivano Balić (born 1979), Croatian handballer
Josip Balić (born 1993), Croatian footballer
Maro Balić (born 1971), Croatian water polo player
Saša Balić (born 1990), Montenegrin footballer
Smail Balić (1920-2002), Bosnian-Austrian historian, culturologist and scholar
Vladimir Balić (born 1970), Croatian footballer

See also
Balići, village in Serbia
Balići, Novi Travnik, village in Bosnia and Herzegovina
Baličević, surname
Baličić, surname
Belić, surname
Bilić (surname)
Bulić, surname

Croatian surnames
Montenegrin surnames
Bosnian surnames